SSV may refer to:

 SSV (band), a German techno music group
 Soviet command ship SSV-33
 Special Service Vehicles (SSVs), North American police vehicles
 Small saphenous vein
 SSV (game architecture), by SETA, Sammy, and Visco
 SSV Helsinki, a Finnish floorball team
  Side-by-side (vehicle), small off-road vehicle
 Strategic Sealift Vessel (Philippine Navy)
Simian sarcoma virus
 SSV1, in Fuselloviridae